The West Java Regional People's Representative Council is the unicameral legislature of the Indonesian province of West Java.

History
The council was first founded in 1950, with Djaja Rahmat as its speaker. The council, which was called a "temporary provincial council" initially had 60 members. Before 1950, a similar body was present which was headed by Oto Iskandar di Nata.  After being renamed to its present name in 1955, the number of councillors went up from 60 to 75, down to 74, before becoming the present 100.

Composition

Speakers

Electoral districts

For the 2019 legislative election, there will be 120 seats for contest from 15 electoral districts:
West Java 1: Bandung, Cimahi (8 seats)
West Java 2: Bandung Regency (10 seats)
West Java 3: West Bandung Regency (4 seats)
West Java 4: Cianjur Regency (6 seats)
West Java 5: Sukabumi, Sukabumi Regency (8 seats)
West Java 6: Bogor Regency (11 seats)
West Java 7: Bogor (3 seats)
West Java 8: Bekasi, Depok (11 seats)
West Java 9: Bekasi Regency (7 seats)
West Java 10: Karawang Regency, Purwakarta Regency (8 seats)
West Java 11: Majalengka Regency, Subang Regency, Sumedang Regency (11 seats)
West Java 12: Cirebon, Cirebon Regency, Indramayu Regency (12 seats)
West Java 13: Banjar, Ciamis Regency, Kuningan Regency, Pangandaran Regency (8 seats)
West Java 14: Garut Regency (6 seats)
West Java 15: Tasikmalaya, Tasikmalaya Regency (7 seats)

References

Politics of West Java
Provincial assemblies of Indonesia
1950 establishments in Indonesia